Ericusa is a small taxonomic genus of medium-sized predatory marine gastropod molluscs in the family Volutidae, the volutes.

Distribution
Ericusa are endemic to Australia. They are found in temperate waters from southern Queensland to southern Western Australia.

Shell description
The shells of Ericusa have a small rounded protoconch, are biconical with a rounded shoulder and have an elongate aperture with 4 distinct columellar plicae and a thickened outer lip. The whorls are regular, smooth and convex. The protoconch is globose and deviates 45° from the axis of the shell. The colour pattern of Ericusa is pink or yellow brown overlaid with a varied brown pattern.

The largest species with shells exceeding 200 mm in length are Ericusa fulgetrum and Ericusa sowerbyi.

Biology
Ericusa are nocturnal and prey on invertebrates. They have a large foot and siphon and they lay relatively large solitary eggs.

Taxonomy
Several infraspecific taxa of Ericusa fulgetra have been named, on the basis of colour patterns of the shell.

Species
 Ericusa fulgetrum (Sowerby I, 1825)
 Ericusa papillosa (Swainson, 1822)
 Ericusa sericata Thornley, 1951
 Ericusa sowerbyi (Kiener, 1839)

References

 Bail, P & Poppe, G. T. 2001. A conchological iconography: a taxonomic introduction of the recent Volutidae. Hackenheim-Conchbook, 30 pp, 5 pl.

External links
. Gastropods.com : Ericusa; accessed : 15 December 2010]

Volutidae